Blake Thomas Beemer (born March 4, 1991) is a baseball coach and former outfielder and first baseman, who is the current head baseball coach of the Butler Bulldogs. He played college baseball at Ball State.

Playing career
Beemer grew up in Dayton, Ohio, where he attended Northmont High School, where he was a three-year letterwinner for the Thunderbolts in baseball, but also participated in soccer. He batted .422 as a senior in 2009.

Beemer enrolled at Ball State University, where he played baseball for the Cardinals. In 2010, his freshman year, he appeared in 51 games (making 45 starts), slashing .328/.448/.846 with 2 home runs, 28 runs batted in (RBIs), 11doubles, and 40 runs scored. Following his freshman performance, Beemer entered the 2011 season with high expectations for his sophomore year. A sophomore slump which saw his batting average fall to .212 by March 7. By the end of the year, his batting average had climbed to .273, with 1 home run. In the 2012 season as a junior, Beemer hit 0 home runs and 9 doubles. Beemer had a better senior year, leading the team in doubles (16), triples (3) and walks (28).

Coaching career
Beemer began his coaching career as an volunteer assistant for the Penn State Nittany Lions, where he worked with the team's outfielders and coached first base.

Beemer was hired by the Eastern Illinois Panthers in the summer of 2015. He was named the top assistant and recruiting coordinator. He aided in recruiting Trey Sweeney and Will Klein, each of which went in the top five rounds of the 2021 Major League Baseball draft and 2020 Major League Baseball drafts, respectively. He returned to Ball State in the fall of 2018, being named the recruiting coordinator for the Cardinals.

On June 21, 2022, Beemer was named the head coach of the Butler Bulldogs.

Head coaching record

References

External links

Butler Bulldogs bio

Living people
1991 births
Ball State Cardinals baseball coaches
Ball State Cardinals baseball players
Butler Bulldogs baseball coaches
Eastern Illinois Panthers baseball coaches
Penn State Nittany Lions baseball coaches
African-American baseball coaches